Luis Román Ojeda Alva (born May 10, 1980) is a Peruvian football midfielder from the district of Chancay in Huaral, Peru. He currently plays for Sport Huancayo in the Peruvian First Division. He is also the older brother of Rodolfo Ojeda.

Club career
Luis Román Ojeda started his career playing for Sport Dinámico, a local team from his hometown. He then went on to play for other local teams such as Defensor Huaura, Aurora Chancayllo y Juventud Torreblanca. Then in 2002 Ojeda joined Peruvian Second Division side Unión Huaral. That year he debuted in the 2002 Segunda División Peruana season. Then in 2003 he joined Peruvian Second Division side Olimpico Somos Perú, where he played the 2003, 2004, and 2005 seasons.

In 2006, he joined Peruvian Second Division club Atlético Minero. He helped his side finish in 2nd place at the end of the 2007 season and thus promotion to the Peruvian First Division. With Atlético Minero Ojeda made his debut in the Peruvian First Division in the Second Round of the 2008 Torneo Descentralizado season at home in the Matucana stadium against Sport Boys. The manager José Ramírez Cuba allowed him to play the entire match, which finished in a 3–0 win for his club. Ojeda made 44 league appearances that season. However his club was relegated at the end of the season as they lost in the relegation decider match against Juan Aurich.

In 2009, he transferred, along with his brother Rodolfo Ojeda, to Sporting Cristal for the start of the 2009 season. However, he did not manage to break into the first team and left Sporting Cristal without making any league appearances.

References

External links

1980 births
Living people
People from Lima Region
Association football midfielders
Peruvian footballers
Unión Huaral footballers
Olímpico Somos Perú footballers
Atlético Minero footballers
Sporting Cristal footballers
Colegio Nacional Iquitos footballers
Cienciano footballers
Sport Huancayo footballers
Peruvian Segunda División players
Peruvian Primera División players